Valeriy Oleksandrovich Hubenko was the very first chief of the State Border Guard Service of Ukraine in 1991–1994, the second recipient of the General of the Army of Ukraine (1994).

References

External links
 Valeriy Hubenko profile at the Dovidka: Ukraine official today
 Valeriy Hubenko profile at the State Border Guard Service of Ukraine website

1939 births
2000 deaths
Military personnel from Kyiv
Frunze Military Academy alumni
Military Academy of the General Staff of the Armed Forces of the Soviet Union alumni
Recipients of the Medal "For Distinction in Guarding the State Border of the USSR"
Recipients of the Order of Bohdan Khmelnytsky, 3rd class
Recipients of the Order of the Red Banner of Labour
Recipients of the Order of the Red Star
Ukrainian border guards
Generals of the Army (Ukraine)
Burials at Baikove Cemetery